The R590 road is a regional road in Ireland which links the village of Crookstown with the N22 to the northeast of Bandon in County Cork.

See also 

 Roads in Ireland
 National primary road
 National secondary road

References 

Regional roads in the Republic of Ireland
Roads in County Cork